Ronaldo de Oliveira Strada (born 22 August 1996), or simply known as Ronaldo, is a Brazilian footballer who plays as a goalkeeper for Atlético Goianiense.

Club career
Born in Salvador, Ronaldo joined Vitória's youth setup at the age of 14. He was promoted to the main squad in 2015, but only made his first team debut on 24 May 2018, starting in a 0–0 home draw against Sampaio Corrêa, for the year's Copa do Nordeste.

After starting the 2018 campaign as a third-choice behind Fernando Miguel and Caíque, Ronaldo became a backup option to new signing Elias after Fernando Miguel moved to Vasco da Gama. He then made his Série A debut on 6 June 2018, starting in a 1–0 home win against Chapecoense, and subsequently became the first-choice.

On 3 September 2018, Ronaldo renewed his contract until December 2021.

Career statistics

References

External links

1996 births
Living people
Sportspeople from Salvador, Bahia
Brazilian footballers
Association football goalkeepers
Campeonato Brasileiro Série A players
Campeonato Brasileiro Série B players
Esporte Clube Vitória players